Vladislaus I of Poland may refer to:
Władysław I Herman (ca. 1044 - 1102), Duke of Poland
Władysław I the Elbow-high (1261 – 1333), King of Poland

See also
Ladislaus I (disambiguation)